The 1966 Men's World Weightlifting Championships were held in East Berlin, East Germany from October 15 to October 21, 1966. There were 117 men in action from 28 nations.

Medal summary

Medal table

References
Results (Sport 123)
Weightlifting World Championships Seniors Statistics

External links

International Weightlifting Federation

World Weightlifting Championships
World Weightlifting Championships
International sports competitions hosted by East Germany
World Weightlifting Championships
International weightlifting competitions hosted by Germany
October 1966 sports events in Europe
Sports competitions in East Berlin
1960s in Berlin